Øyrlandsodden is a headland in Sørkapp Land at Spitsbergen, Svalbard.

References

Headlands of Spitsbergen